Taher Fakhruddin is the 54th Da'i al-Mutlaq of the Qutbi Bohras, a sect within Shia Islam. He is the son of Khuzaima Qutbuddin, the 53rd Syedna succession controversy (Dawoodi Bohra). After the death of the 52nd Da'i al-Mutlaq, Mohammed Burhanuddin, due to the succession controversy, one claimant emerged,Khuzaima Qutbuddin. Followers of Khuzaima Qutbuddin regard Taher Fakhruddin as a rightly appointed Da'i al-Mutlaq whereas followers of Mufaddal Saifuddin do not recognise him as the Da'i al-Mutlaq.

One of Taher Fakhruddin's major decisions was regarding the burial arrangements of his father and predecessor in office, Khuzaima Qutbuddin who died on 31 March 2016, where Taher Fakhruddin decided to bring Qutbuddin's body to India for burial.

Qutbuddin had filed a case at the Bombay High Court against Saifuddin in 2014 in order to determine which claimant had received a valid appointment of succession from Burhanuddin. It is expected that Fakhruddin will continue his father's efforts against Saifuddin at the Bombay High Court.

References

Living people
1968 births
Dawoodi Bohra da'is